is a game for the Nintendo 3DS released by Natsume. It is the last entry in the franchise released on the Nintendo 3DS systems to receive the title of Harvest Moon.

Gameplay
The story involves reviving an abandoned town named Echo Village in order to allow the residents and animals to return.

New features to the Harvest Moon series include extensive character customization, design of the house and furniture of the protagonist, and the ability to customize the appearance of the village the game takes place in.

The multiplayer mode is region-free, and players can bring their cows and furry animals like sheep and alpaca, and can milk or shear each other's animals. Sometimes a giant animal will spawn, which give players five big products. Starting players can get a lot of money from collecting animal products in multiplayer, thus the good reception of the multiplayer feature. Players must bring a gift which will be swapped randomly at the beginning of the session. Players can do multiplayer over local connection or Internet, and with "Anyone" or "Friends".

There are twelve marriage candidates for the player to choose from, six women and six men. Each are unlocked at different points during the game as the town is developed, and three are not unlocked until the end of the game including the Witch Princess, Amir, and Sanjay.

Development
Natsume, Inc. announced on May 29, 2012, that Harvest Moon 3D: A New Beginning would be released in North America. The game was released early by Natsume in North America and started shipping on October 19 instead of closer to its original street date, November 6. It was announced on June 5, 2013, that the game would be released in Europe by Marvelous AQL Europe during Q3 of 2013. A New Beginning is the first true 3DS Harvest Moon game, preceded by Harvest Moon: The Tale of Two Towns which was developed for the DS and released alongside a port for the 3DS. A New Beginning introduces features to the series, including the ability to fully customize the player, farm, and the town of setting.

Release
Special edition preorders included a stuffed cow doll, and regular version preorders included a yak doll. The publisher Natsume announced on October 17, 2012, that the game had gone gold and that there was "unprecedented" interest in the special 15th anniversary edition of the game.

Reception

The game received above-average reviews according to the review aggregation website Metacritic. IGN cited the edit features, character customization, extensive tutorials, and a gradual beginning. In Japan, Famitsu gave it a score of 32 out of 40.

References

External links
Marvelous AQL Inc. page 

2012 video games
Story of Seasons games
Marvelous Entertainment
Nintendo 3DS games
Nintendo 3DS eShop games
Nintendo 3DS-only games
Nintendo Network games
Video games developed in Japan
Video games featuring protagonists of selectable gender
Video games scored by Kumi Tanioka